Kuvshinskaya Salma is a rural locality (an inhabited locality) in administrative jurisdiction of the closed administrative-territorial formation of Alexandrovsk in Murmansk Oblast, Russia, located beyond the Arctic Circle at the height of  above sea level. As of the 2010 Census, it had no recorded population.

References

Notes

Sources
Official website of Murmansk Oblast. Registry of the Administrative-Territorial Structure of Murmansk Oblast 

Rural localities in Murmansk Oblast